The SS Espagne was a Belgian cargo ship that was torpedoed by the Imperial German Navy submarine  in the English Channel off St. Catherine's Point, Isle of Wight, United Kingdom while she was travelling from Le Havre, France to Newport, Monmouthshire, United Kingdom.

Construction 
Espagne was launched on 6 February 1909 with yard number 40 at the Chantiers Navals Anversois shipyard in Hoboken, Antwerp, Belgium. She was completed the following month, having been ordered by the Antwerp shipping company Armement Adolf Deppe.

She had a triple expansion steam engine driving a single screw propeller. Steam was supplied by two boilers; the engine was rated at 150 nhp. It was made by the North East Marine Engine Co Ltd. Hartlepool, County Durham, United Kingdom. Her crew numbered 24.

1915 Incident 
Espagne was lying at anchor in the Bristol Channel on 5 March 1915, when at 17 minutes past midnight the British passenger liner (in use as a troop ship for the Royal Navy) HMT Dongola inbound from Avonmouth, collided with her. The Dongola was damaged below the waterline and taking on water on the starboard side at the bow.

She was subsequently beached in Porthkerry Bay, west of Barry, South Wales and was able to patch the damage and temporarily stop the leak. Her passengers were taken off by two Royal Navy patrol ships with the Barry lifeboat being in attendance in case of need. At 4.48 am the rising tide refloated the ship and she was winched into Barry Docks by 8 am. Dongola was repaired and returned to service on 17 March.

Sinking 
On 25 December 1917, Espagne was in ballast on a voyage from Le Havre, Seine-Maritime, France to Newport, Monmouthshire, United Kingdom. The ship sank to a depth of over ,.

The wreck 
The engine lies on its side and the two boilers one of which stands on one end.

Notes
 Measurement given in imperial units in source, presented as metric converted to imperial for consistency.

References

1909 ships
Ships built in Belgium
Steamships of Belgium
Merchant ships of Belgium
World War I merchant ships of Belgium
Ships sunk by German submarines in World War I
World War I shipwrecks in the English Channel
Maritime incidents in 1917
Wreck diving sites in the United Kingdom
Maritime incidents in 1915